Rain Lover (1964-1989) was a champion Australian Thoroughbred racehorse best remembered for his back-to-back wins in the 1968 and 1969 VRC Melbourne Cup.

Background
Rain Lover was sired by the good racehorse, Latin Lover (GB) (a son of the unbeaten Ribot). His dam Rain Spot was by Valognes (GB). He was owned and bred by Clifford A. Reid, who won the 1945 Melbourne Cup with Rainbird. Trainer Mick L. Robins, a former coal miner from Broken Hill, New South Wales had obtained his trainer's licence just three months before he took over Rain Lover's conditioning.

Racing career
In his first Melbourne Cup triumph, under jockey Jim Johnson, Rain Lover won by a record eight-length margin and in a record time of 3:19.1.

Controversy surrounded his second win as the hot favourite and heavily backed Big Philou trained by Bart Cummings was the victim of a doping scandal and was withdrawn from the race 39 minutes before the start. Burdened with 9 st. 7 lbs. Rain Lover still went on to win the race in game fashion by a neck from Alsop and created history as the first back-to-back winner since Archer in 1861 and 1862.

Amongst his other major wins were the SAJC Adelaide Cup, VATC St George Stakes (twice) and the AJC Chipping Norton Stakes.

Stud record
Retired to stud in 1970, Rain Lover enjoyed moderate success as a sire before his death in 1989. One of his best winners being Princess Veronica (VATC Easter Cup).

References

External links
 Rain Lover's pedigree and partial racing stats

1964 racehorse births
1989 racehorse deaths
Racehorses bred in Australia
Racehorses trained in Australia
Melbourne Cup winners
Australian Champion Racehorse of the Year
Australian Racing Hall of Fame horses
Thoroughbred family 1-g